Kolong is a 2019 Malaysian Malay-language horror film. It is released on 17 October 2019 in Malaysia.

Synopsis 
Suri dreams of becoming an actress but her money, which she has borrowed from a "money lender", gets stolen by a travel agency. The thugs are now hunting her down to force her to pay her debt. She plans to get her mother's grant to pay for it but she is stopped by her sister. In dire need of money, she decides to accept a high-paying job as a caretaker of a blind man, since she has experience taking care of her blind mother. She encourages herself to go to the man's bungalow, even though it is supposedly haunted by the spirit of his late wife.

Cast 
 Wan Raja as Hairi 
 Luthya Sury Widjaja as Seri
 Annie Arifin as Hanna
 Joey Daud as Dr Umar
 Vannessa Angle as Citra
 Mamak Puteh as Putih

References

External links 
 Kolong in Cinema.com.my

Malay-language films
2019 films
Malaysian horror films